The Military ranks of Women's Services in WWII are the military insignia used by the various all female military services and units during World War II.

Germany

Italian Social Republic
Officers

Enlisted

United Kingdom
Officers

Enlisted ranks

Notes

References

Military ranks of the United Kingdom
Military insignia